This was the first edition of the tournament.

Dutch pair Jasper Smit and Martijn van Haasteren won the title, defeating British pair Colin Fleming and Jamie Murray in the final, 6–2, 2–6, [10–8].

Seeds

Draw

Draw

References

External links
 Main Draw (ATP)
 Official ATP

Irish Open